The Balıkesir Subregion (Turkish: Balıkesir Alt Bölgesi) (TR22) is a statistical subregion in Turkey.

Provinces 

 Balıkesir Province (TR221)
 Çanakkale Province (TR222)

See also 

 NUTS of Turkey

External links 
 TURKSTAT

Sources 
 ESPON Database

Statistical subregions of Turkey